Nirgal Vallis is a long river channel bordering the Coprates quadrangle and Margaritifer Sinus quadrangle of Mars at 28.4° south latitude and 42° west longitude.  It is 610 km long and is named after Nergal, the Babylonian god of war and counterpart to the Roman god of war Mars.  Nirgal Vallis had a discharge of 4800 cubic meters/second.  The western half of Nirgal Valles is a branched system, but the eastern half is a tightly sinuous, deeply entrenched valley.  Nirgal Valles ends at Uzboi Vallis.  Tributaries are very short and end in steep-walled valley heads, often called "amphitheater-headed valleys."  The shape of these valley heads is like cirques on the Earth.

Water from Nirgal Vallis contributed to a great flood that went through the rim of Holden Crater and helped form a lake in the crater.   It's estimated that Nirgal Vallis had a discharge of 4800 cubic meters/second.   Water from Nirgal Vallis was inbounded in Uzboi Vallis because the rim of Holden Crater blocked the flow.  At a certain point the stored water broke through the rim of Holden and created a lake 200–250 m deep.  Water with a depth of at least 50 m entered Holden at a rate that 5-10 times the discharge of the Mississippi River.  Terraces and the presence of large rocks (tens of meters across) support these high discharge rates.

Nirgal Vallis and sapping
Nirgal Valles is one of the longest valley networks on Mars.  It is so large that it is found on two quadrangles.  Scientists are not sure about how all the ancient river valleys were formed.  There is evidence that instead of rain or snow, the water that formed the valleys originated under ground.  One mechanism that has been advanced is sapping. In this case, the ground just gives away as water comes out.  Sapping is common in some desert areas in America's Southwest.  It forms alcoves and stubby tributaries; these features are visible in the pictures below of Nirgal Vallis taken with Mars Odyssey's THEMIS.

See also

References

External links

Valleys and canyons on Mars
Coprates quadrangle
Margaritifer Sinus quadrangle